Melaleuca sciotostyla, commonly known as Wongan melaleuca, is a plant in the myrtle family, Myrtaceae, and is endemic to the south-west of Western Australia. It is an endangered species with only 476 mature plants known in 2001. It is closely related and very similar to Melaleuca haplantha but has narrower leaves and fewer stamens per flower than that species.

Description
Its leaves are arranged in alternating pairs, each pair at right angles to the ones above and below (decussate) so that the leaves form four rows along the stems.

The flowers are cream to white and arranged in small heads on the ends of branches which continue to grow after flowering and sometimes in the upper leaf axils. The stamens are arranged in five bundles around the flowers and there are 12 to 17 stamens per bundle.

Taxonomy and naming
Melaleuca sciotostyla was first formally described in 1988 by Bryan Barlow in Australian Systematic Botany as a new species. The specific epithet (sciotostyla) is from the Ancient Greek skiotos meaning "shaded by gradation in colour" referring to the coloration of the end of the style which appears to have been dyed.

Distribution and habitat
Melaleuca sciotostyla is confined to the Cadoux, Wongan Hills and Meckering districts in the Avon Wheatbelt and Jarrah Forest biogeographic regions growing in clayey sand and laterite on scree slopes.

Conservation
Melaleuca sciotostyla is listed as "endangered" by the Australian Government Department of the Environment. It is classed as "Declared Rare and Priority Flora" by the Government of Western Australia Department of Parks and Wildlife meaning that it is likely to become extinct or rare and therefore in need of special protection.

References

sciotostyla
Myrtales of Australia
Plants described in 1988
Endemic flora of Western Australia